Sébastien David (born 27 June 1976) is a French politician. He became Member of Parliament for the Aveyron's 3rd constituency on 1 August 2021, following the resignation of Arnaud Viala, who became president of the Departmental Council of Aveyron.He resigned from Parliament on 13 September 2021 to return as Mayor of Saint-Affrique.

In the 2021 The Republicans congress, he backed Xavier Bertrand in the 1st round, then gave his support in the 2nd round to Valérie Pécresse.

References 

1976 births
Living people
Deputies of the 15th National Assembly of the French Fifth Republic

21st-century French politicians
The Republicans (France) politicians
Members of Parliament for Aveyron